Racism in Vietnam has been mainly directed by the majority and dominant ethnic Vietnamese Kinh against ethnic minorities such as Degars (Montagnards), Chams and the Khmer Krom.

History

Race issues and Khmer–Vietnamese racial violence during the First Indochina War 
 
Historian Shawn McHale notes that despite the popular notion of the First Indochina War not being a war of race and xenophobia told from the Vietnamese side, in reality many Vietnamese writers and intellectuals, which were heavily influenced by social Darwinism before the Second World War, had increasingly employed a lot of racist and ethnonationalist-themed contents and rumors during the war. They included racial antagonizing the popular images of black, Arab, Khmer, and indigenous peoples, and a civilization hierarchy based on skin color in the 1940–50s polyethnic Vietnam. For instance, nationalist propaganda leaflet in the Mekong Delta in 1951 claiming how the "barbaric French" were "dyeing" Vietnamese soldiers into black Africans and Moroccans.
 
The period marked that unusual phenomenon happened in the very mainstream level of Vietnamese-language media, a vicious anti-black and xenophobic hatred. Those rhetorical expressions appeared widespread in popular slogans, newspapers, graphic imagery such as propaganda posters and cartoons, fallacious depicting the dark-skinned (also including the Khmer and indigenous peoples of South Vietnam) as savages, while emphasizing the Vietnamese struggles "to protect the Vietnamese race (nồi giống)" from replacement by blacks, Arabs, and ethnic minorities. The Vietnamese construct of race at the time was the one who shared "biological bloodline" or having the common Vietnamese descent. The term đồng bào (compatriots) also accentuates the same meanings, were later extended to the Chinese in Mekong Delta who had often intermarried with the Vietnamese, but was never applied to peoples of Cham, Malay, and Khmer ethnicities. The high percentages of Black Africans and Arabs in the French Expeditionary Corp were likely reasons for Vietnamese deep animosity toward blackness. Such intense antagonisms received little condemnation from the Viet Minh leaders who at the same time also realized that those Black and Arab soldiers were also victims of the French colonial empire.
 
For example, Đào Duy Anh once stated in the 1940s: "the culture of the American and European peoples is high, while the culture of the savage peoples (dân tộc mọi rợ) of Africa and Australia, just like that of the Mường, Mán, Mọi in our country, is deficient." A Dân sinh newspaper published on January 14, 1946 triumphed "Now, no one would dare claim that the Vietnamese nation is a tribe of savages (một bộ tộc mọi rợ), since the Vietnamese people have exercised self-determination and self-rule through elections!" Hanoi journalist Phùng Tri Lai in 1950 vigorously characterized African minorities in terms of their so-called "nudity, barbaric habits, and custom of eating human flesh." When Catholic members in the Viet Minh resistance appealed to fellow Catholic in the Mekong Delta in 1949, they invoked the fear of racial extinction: "You cannot fold your arms and watch the enemy wipe out the race." On the opposite view, Khmer Krom monk Trịnh Thới Cang in 1949 argued that, without education, Cambodian minority of Vietnam would be practically viewed no more than the Blacks of America in the perception of Vietnamese intellectuals. It was common during the war for ethnic minorities in Vietnam who were deemed "darker-skinned," were considered culturally inferior to the Vietnamese.
 
From even before the beginning of the war, Vietnamese ethnic violence and repressions conducted by various factions against the Khmer Krom of the Mekong Delta had already accelerated. Trần Văn Trà in early 1946 admitted that the Party "used force to repress, and arrested hundreds of Khmer." These resulted in an outbreak of ethnic tensions, mass murders, chaotic pillaging of towns, and race riots committed from both Khmer and Viet populaces erupted and spread throughout the Delta from August 1945 to March 1946.
 
McHale concludes racial violence and race issues during the First Indochina War which often seen as marginal, outside the mainstream scholarship: "...,the First Indochina War was a race war. But it was not like World War II, in which Japanese propagandists spoke of a "Yamato race" fighting whites in a bitter global struggle, or Nazis defined Germans as a pure Aryan "race" fighting against racial others. Neither was it a Fanonian war pitting white colonialists against a darker foe. Rather, in the worst of times, Vietnamese sometimes perceived the war as a struggle for their own racial or ethnic survival against enemies, who ranged from French rapists and killers to Moroccan and Senegalese cannibals and on to Khmer Krom decapitators."

South Vietnam 

Starting from 1955, the South Vietnamese government of Ngô Đình Diệm carried out an assimilation program against the indigenous peoples of the Central Highlands and the Cham, banning the teaching of Cham language in public schools in Cham areas, discriminating highland groups, while seizing indigenous lands for the Northern Kinh colonists. This resulted in increasing nationalist and independent sentiments among the Cham and the indigenous peoples. Some Cham joined the communist NFL, some other joined FLC and FLHPC Front de Libeùration des Hauts Plateaux du Champa (Liberation of Highlands and Champa). By 1964, civil right activists and independent organizations of the indigenous peoples, including Cham organizations, had been merged into Front Unifieù de Lutte des Races Opprimeùes (FULRO), which fought against the governments of the Republic of Vietnam and succeeding Socialist Republic of Vietnam until late 1980s.

Chams

The Cham in Vietnam are only recognized as a minority, and not as an indigenous people by the Vietnamese government despite being indigenous to central and southern Vietnam. Both Hindu and Muslim Chams have experienced religious and ethnic persecution and restrictions on their faith under the current Vietnamese government, with the Vietnamese state confiscating Cham property and forbidding Cham from observing their religious beliefs. Hindu temples were turned into tourist sites against the wishes of the Cham Hindus. In 2010 and 2013 several incidents occurred in Thành Tín and Phươc Nhơn villages where Cham were murdered by Vietnamese.

Highlanders

The Kinh Vietnamese dominated government media propagate negative stereotypes of the highlander ethnic minorities, labeling them as "ignorant", "illiterate", "backward" and claim that they are impoverished and underdeveloped because of their own lack of economic and agricultural skills. The ethnic Kinh settlers in the highlands have negative stereotypes and views of the highlanders with barely any intermarriage and little interaction since they deliberately choose to live in different villages with other ethnic Kinh. The Vietnamese government has promoted the ethnic Kinh migration to the highlands as bringing "development" to the highlanders.

Montagnards 
Montagnards are made up of many different tribes that are indigenous to the Central Highlands of Vietnam. In the past, Montagnards were referred to as "mọi" (savages), by the Vietnamese. Vietnamese textbooks used to describe Montagnards as people with long tails and excessive body hair. Nowadays, the non-offensive term "người Thượng" (highlanders), is used instead.  

In 1956, President Ngo Dinh Diem launched programs to resettle ethnic Kinh Vietnamese and northern ethnic minorities into the central highlands. These programs also sought to assimilate the Montagnards into mainstream Vietnamese society. This was the beginning of the struggle between ethnic Kinh and Montagnards. After the Vietnam war, the government further encouraged the ethnic Kinh to resettle in the highlands to cultivate coffee after the demand for coffee in the world boomed. Approximately 1,000,000 ethnic Kinh were forcibly resettled to the central highlands. This resettlement caused conflict between the ethnic Kinh and Montagnards because the Montagnards believed the ethnic Kinh were encroaching on their land. This conflict lead to resentment from the Montagnards which lead to some deadly protests against the ethnic Kinh. 

Montagnards have faced religious persecution from the communist Vietnamese government since the end of the Vietnam war. The Vietnamese government has a list of government-approved religious organizations and requires that all religious groups register with the government. Any religious groups that are considered to be going against national interests are repressed and shut down. The Vietnamese government claim the independent Montagnard religious groups use religion to incite unrest. They use this to justify their capture, detainment, and interrogation of Montagnard political activists, leaders, and shut down of unregistered Montagnard churches. Followers of unregistered churches and religious activists have also been harassed, arrested, imprisoned, or placed under house arrest by authorities. 

In 2001 and 2004, there were major protests from thousands of Montagnards. They protested against the repression and religious persecution from the Vietnamese government and demanded their land back. In 2001, there was a Montagnard independence movement facilitated by MFI members. These protests lead to deaths and mass imprisonments.

Khmer Krom

See also
Anti-Vietnamese sentiment
Bụi đời

References

Sources  

  

Human rights abuses in Vietnam
Demographics of Vietnam
Vietnham
Vietnamese culture
Ethnic conflicts
Ethnic groups in Vietnam